Zanobi Poggino of Zanobi di Poggino (16th century) was an Italian painter, active as a portrait and historical painter in Florence. He was a pupil of Giovanni Antonio Sogliani. While he was noted by Filippo Baldinucci, none of his works could be identified by Luigi Lanzi.

References

16th-century Italian painters
Italian male painters
Painters from Florence
Italian Renaissance painters
Year of death unknown
Year of birth unknown